The Beginning and the End is a 1993 Mexican drama film directed by Arturo Ripstein. The film was selected as the Mexican entry for the Best Foreign Language Film at the 67th Academy Awards, but was not accepted as a nominee. This film is an adaptation of the 1960 novel by Egyptian author Naguib Mahfouz.

Cast
 Ernesto Laguardia as Gabriel Botero
 Julieta Egurrola as Ignacia Botero
 Blanca Guerra as Julia
 Verónica Merchant as Natalia
 Bruno Bichir as Nicolás Botero
 Alberto Estrella as Guama Botero
 Alonso Echánove as Cariñoso
 Lucía Muñoz as Mireya Botero
 Luis Felipe Tovar as César
 Julián Pastor as Luján
  as Isabel

See also
 List of submissions to the 67th Academy Awards for Best Foreign Language Film
 List of Mexican submissions for the Academy Award for Best Foreign Language Film

References

External links
 

1993 films
1993 drama films
1990s Spanish-language films
Mexican drama films
Films directed by Arturo Ripstein
1990s Mexican films